Xylophanes balcazari is a moth of the  family Sphingidae. It is found from Mexico and possibly south to Belize. Although originally thought to be a member of Xylophanes neoptolemus, it was given its own designation due to DNA barcoding results.

References

balcazari
Moths described in 2008
Endemic Lepidoptera of Mexico